The Northport Range Lights were a set of range lights on Prince Edward Island, Canada. They were built in 1885, and the rear light was deactivated around 1970; the front light is still active as the rear light of the new range.

See also
 List of lighthouses in Prince Edward Island
 List of lighthouses in Canada

References

External links
Picture of Northport Range Rear Light Lightouse Friends
 Aids to Navigation Canadian Coast Guard

Lighthouses completed in 1885
Lighthouses in Prince Edward Island